Donn Grimm is a retired American football player. He was a linebacker on the Notre Dame team that won the 1988 Consensus National Championship. He was a four-time letterman with the Irish. He was awarded each year from 1987 until his senior year in 1990. In 1989, he came in second on the team for tackles. After graduation, he signed with the Phoenix Cardinals as a rookie free agent in 1991.

Donn is the brother of Pro Football Hall of Famer Russ Grimm, who mentioned him in his enshrinement speech at the Hall in August 2010. He is the uncle of Cody Grimm, a safety with the Tampa Bay Buccaneers.

References
Notre Dame Football Yearly Leaders
Notre Dame Football All Time Lineups -- 1980–1997
The Lost Lettermen: Donn Grimm

Players of American football from Pennsylvania
Notre Dame Fighting Irish football players
Living people
Year of birth missing (living people)